The De Tomaso Pantera is a mid-engine sports car produced by Italian automobile manufacturer De Tomaso from 1971 to 1992. Italian for "Panther", the Pantera was the automaker's most popular model, with over 7,000 manufactured over its twenty-year production run. More than three quarters of the production was sold by American Lincoln-Mercury dealers from 1972 to 1975; after this agreement ended De Tomaso kept manufacturing the car in ever smaller numbers into the early 1990s.

History
The Pantera was designed by the Italian design firm Carrozzeria Ghia's American-born designer Tom Tjaarda and replaced the Mangusta. Unlike the Mangusta, which employed a steel backbone chassis, the Pantera's chassis was of a steel monocoque design, the first instance of De Tomaso using this construction technique. The Pantera logo included a T-shaped symbol that was the brand used by De Tomaso's Argentinian cattle ranching ancestors, as well as a version of the Argentinean flag turned on its side, inspired by the company's founder, Alejandro De Tomaso, having been born and raised in Argentina.

The car debuted in Modena in March 1970 and was presented at the 1970 New York Motor Show a few weeks later. Approximately a year later the first production cars were sold, and production was increased to three per day. De Tomaso sold the rights to the Pantera to Ford, who were to distribute the cars in the United States, but Alejandro De Tomaso retained the rights to market the Pantera in Europe.

Reflecting its makers' transatlantic ambitions, the Pantera came with an abundance of standard features which appeared exotic in Europe, such as electric windows, air conditioning and even "doors that buzz when ... open". By the time the Pantera reached production stage, the interior was in most respects well sorted, although resting an arm on the central console could lead to inadvertently activating the poorly located cigarette lighter.

The high torque provided by the Ford engine reduced the need for excessive gear changing at low speeds: this made the car much less demanding to drive in urban conditions than many of the locally built offerings.

The ZF transaxle used in the Mangusta was also used for the Pantera: a passenger in an early Pantera recorded that the mechanical noises emanating from the transaxle were more intrusive than the well restrained engine noise. Another Italian car that shared the ZF transaxle is the Maserati Bora, also launched in 1971 although not then available for sale. Power-assisted four-wheel disc brakes and rack and pinion steering were all standard equipment on the Pantera. The 1971 Pantera could accelerate to 97 km/h (60 mph) in 5.5 seconds according to Car and Driver.

In the spring of 1972, De Tomaso introduced the more sporting GTS model for the European market. The GTS was developed for Group 3 racing and received a more powerful engine with  DIN at 6000 rpm, thanks to a 11.0 : 1 compression ratio (versus 8.0 : 1 in the US market Pantera), larger Holley carburettors, a forged aluminum intake manifold, and freer flowing exhaust headers. The GTS also has considerably wider wheels, a more aggressive steering rack setup, ventilated disc brakes, adjusted spring rates and gear ratios, and conspicuous matte black body elements.

In the United States

Late in 1971, Ford began importing the Pantera for the American market to be sold through its Lincoln-Mercury dealers. The first 75 cars were simply European imports and are known for their "push-button" door handles and hand-built Carrozzeria Vignale bodies. A total of 1,007 cars reached the United States that year. As with most Italian cars of the day, rust-proofing was minimal and the quality of fit and finish on these early models was poor with large amounts of body solder being used to cover body panel flaws. Subsequently, Ford increased their involvement in the production of the later cars with the introduction of precision stampings for body panels which resulted in improved overall quality. 
 
Several modifications were made to the Pantera for the 1972 model year. A new  four-bolt main Cleveland Engine, was used with lower compression ratio (from 11:1 to 8.6:1, chiefly to meet US emissions standards and run on lower octane standard fuel) but with the more aggressive "Cobra Jet" camshaft (featuring the same lift and duration as the 428 Cobra Jet's factory performance cam) in an effort to reclaim some of the power lost through the reduction in compression ratio along with a dual point distributor. Many other engine changes were made, including the use of a factory exhaust header.

The "Lusso" (luxury) Pantera L was also introduced in August 1972 as a 1972 model. The "L" model featured many factory upgrades and updates that fixed most of the problems and issues the earlier cars experienced. It was so improved that the 1973 DeTomaso Pantera was Road Test Magazine's Import car of the year beating offerings from Ferrari, Maserati, Lamborghini, and Porsche. During 1973 the dashboard was changed, deviating from two separate pods for the gauges to a unified unit with the dials angled towards the driver.

The European GTS model had sparked interest in the United States, with several grey market cars being imported and many of the performance parts being offered. In the first half of 1974 a US version of the Pantera GTS was introduced, with the first 40 cars only being available in California. This model featured GTS badging and matte black sections as well as a special steering wheel and an electric clock, but not the higher compression engine nor the wheels or other performance modifications of its European counterpart.

Disengagement of Ford 

Ford stopped importing the Pantera to the US in 1975, having sold around 5,500 cars. De Tomaso continued to build the car in ever-escalating forms of performance and luxury for almost two decades for sale in the rest of the world. A small number of cars were imported to the US by gray market importers in the 1980s, notably Panteramerica and AmeriSport. After 1974, Ford discontinued the Cleveland 351 engine, but production continued in Australia until 1982. De Tomaso started sourcing their engines from Australia once the American supplies stopped.

According to De Tomaso the chassis was completely revised in 1980, beginning with chassis number 9000. From May 1980, the lineup included the GT5, which had bonded and riveted-on fibreglass wheelarch extensions and from November 1984 the GT5-S model which had blended arches and a distinctive wide-body look. The GT5 also incorporated better brakes, a more luxurious interior, much larger wheels and tires and the fiberglass body kit also included an air dam and side skirts. Production of the wide body GT5 (and similarly equipped narrow body GTS models) continued until 1985, when the GT5-S replaced the GT5. Although the factory has not made its records available, an analysis based on Vehicle Identification Numbers by the Pantera Owners Club of America (POCA) late model (9000 series) registrar has shown that fewer than 197 GT5 Pantera models were likely to have been built. The GT5-S featured single piece flared steel fenders instead of the GT5's bolted-on fiberglass flares, and a smaller steel front air dam. The 'S' in the GT5-S name stood for "steel". Otherwise the GT5-S was largely identical to the GT5. The POCA 9000 series registrar's VIN analysis indicates that fewer than 183 GT5-S Panteras were built. Concurrent GTS production continued, on a custom order and very limited basis, until the late 1980s.

The car continued to use a Ford V8 engine, although in 1988, when the supply of Ford 351 Cleveland engines from Australia ran out, De Tomaso began installing Ford 351 Windsor engines in the Pantera instead. In all, about 7,260 cars in total were built.

Pantera 90 Si

For 1990 the 351 engine was replaced by the 5.0-litre Ford 302 engine featuring electronic fuel injection and modified cylinder heads, intake manifolds, camshafts, valves, and pistons. Stopping power was improved by the addition of four-wheel ventilated and drilled disc brakes with Brembo calipers that were shared with the Ferrari F40. The Pantera received new styling penned by Marcello Gandini, suspension redesign and a partial chassis redesign. The new model was called the Pantera 90 Si and it was introduced in 1990. Only 41 90 Si models were made before the Pantera was finally phased out in 1993 to make way for the radical Guarà. Out of the 41 cars made, two were used for crash testing, and one was reserved for the De Tomaso museum. As such, only 38 were sold to the public, of which four were converted to Targas by Pavesi. In the UK, the model was sold as Pantera 90.

Specifications

Motorsports

Group 3

De Tomaso offered a Pantera competition car built to special order according to the Group 3 class racing rules between 1972 and 1984 based on the Pantera GTS. 30 cars were built for private customer teams. Group 3 rules were very strict and allowed little modifications to the original road going production cars. Earlier Group 3 cars are infamously called "push button" chassis cars as they were built by hand because De Tomaso did not have a proper assembly line when the Pantera began production. Special equipment of the Group 3 cars included Campagnolo wheels (15 x 8 inches at the front and 15 x 10 inches at the rear), adjustable Koni shocks, racing brakes and special safety equipment required at the time: plexi-glass windows with cutouts, a roll bar, fire extinguisher and racing bucket seats. The engine modifications included a reinforced camshaft, a 10-litre oil pan and a Holley racing 4 barrel carburetor. Displacement of the engine was also enlarged to 5.8-litres. The engine was mated to a 5-speed close ratio gearbox with a heavy duty single plate clutch and a limited slip differential. The Group 3 cars were so competitive that this prompted Porsche to speed up development of the more powerful 911 Carrera RS and Carrera RSR race cars. The use of racing brakes for the Pantera Group 3 was not allowed until 1975 and the car competed with the brakes of the road legal Pantera which proved to be its weak point. Due to an accident in 1973 at the Charade circuit, reinforced hubs developed by De Tomaso for the Group 3 car were approved in Group 3.

Group 4

After the Pantera had begun production, De Tomaso introduced a motorsport oriented Group 3 version of the car. This was followed by a modified Group 4 version in 1972. British engineer and driver Mike Parkes, who had previously developed racing cars for Ferrari was tasked with the development of the new car.

As per the regulations, the Group 4 car was based around the road car's steel monocoque chassis. The double wishbone suspension was substantially modified and Koni adjustable shocks were used in order to improve handling at the track and make room for wider Campagnolo wheels and tyres. Bigger ventilated brakes supplied by Girling and a quick ratio steering rack were used to refine handling and stopping power. The standard steel body shell of the Pantera also received modifications such as aluminium doors, front lid and engine cover along with flared fibre glass wheel arches in order to accommodate the wide wheels and tyres. Plexi glass windows were used throughout and holes were cut into the chassis where possible in order to reduce weight. The car had no front or rear bumpers and a front deep chin spoiler. It also had no rustproofing or interior amenities. The interior was fitted with a cut-off switch instead of a radio, light weight cloth bucket racing seats, a vinyl trim, a roll-cage and drilled aluminium pedals.

Ford, providing a good amount of financial backing in the development of the road going Pantera had little interest in the motorsport version of the car and refused to supply engines for the Group 4 Pantera. De Tomaso engaged a private US based engine builder Bud Moore to supply engines for the car.

Based on the same Ford 351 Cleveland V8 engine used in the road going Pantera, the engine in the Group 4 Pantera was fitted with bespoke aluminium heads, TRW forged pistons, large capacity oil pans and titanium valves. Initially, a single Holley Racing 1150 CFM four barrel carburetor was fitted but this was replaced by four Weber carburetors and a revised intake. The engine had a higher compression ratio of 12.0:1. Displacement of the racing engine was unchanged from road going Pantera's engine. The "spaghetti" styled exhaust system similar to the one used in the Ford GT40 was used. The engine was mated to a ZF 5-speed close ratio manual transmission with a heavy duty single clutch plate.

The first Group 4 Panteras were entered into the 1972 24 Hours of LeMans. The problems of the car then began to become apparent. This was set reportedly high due to Porsche's influence over the governing body of the race. Another problem of the car was the rigidity of its chassis. Nevertheless, the car continued to compete in Group 4 and the engine problem was addressed by sourcing replacement engines with a lower compression ratio. A total of 14 Group 4 cars were made. Some Group 3 cars were modified to Group 4 specifications by privateers.

Group 5

The Group 5 Pantera race cars were converted by private racing teams from Group 4 and Group 3 cars and competed in Group 5 class racing from 1976 to 1981. The Group 5 cars only had wider body panels and no significant design, mechanical and chassis modifications.

However, two cars were extensively modified to compete in the IMSA GTX and Group 5 class respectively. The first car having chassis number #001 was constructed from a new chassis by Italian racing team Sala and Marveti. The second car, having chassis number #1603 was a Group 4 car campaigned by Hugh Kleinpeter in the US and then underwent modification. Afterwards, the former was converted to Group C class specifications in 1983 and the latter was converted to IMSA GTP class specifications respectively. Both cars were uncompetitive in their categories.

Ares Design Project1

Coachbuilder Italian car manufacturer Ares Design manufactured the Project1. It is a modern reinterpretation of the Pantera based on the Lamborghini Huracán chassis.

References

External links

 (August, 1971) Car and Driver
 Pantera Owners Club of America
 The DeTomaso Registry
 Tomaso Pantera Review

Pantera
Rear mid-engine, rear-wheel-drive vehicles
Group 4 (racing) cars
1980s cars
1990s cars
Cars introduced in 1970
Sports cars
Cars discontinued in 1992